Molson Indy can refer to any of the following races:

Grand Prix of Montreal, formerly the Molson Indy Montreal
Honda Indy Toronto, formerly the Molson Indy Toronto
Molson Indy Vancouver, discontinued in 2004